Davion De'Monte Earl Mitchell (born September 5, 1998) is an American professional basketball player for the Sacramento Kings of the National Basketball Association (NBA). He played college basketball for the Auburn Tigers and the Baylor Bears. He was taken ninth overall in the 2021 NBA draft by the Kings.

High school career
Mitchell attended Liberty County High School in Hinesville, Georgia. As a junior, he averaged 24.2 points, 7.1 assists and 2.9 steals per game, leading his team to its first Class 4A state title. Mitchell was named Savannah Morning News Player of the Year. In his senior season, he averaged 23.8 points, 5.3 rebounds and 5.2 assists per game. Mitchell competed for the Georgia Stars on the Amateur Athletic Union circuit. A consensus four-star recruit, he committed to playing college basketball for Auburn over offers from Cincinnati, UConn, Florida, Georgia and Clemson, among others.

College career
As a freshman at Auburn, Mitchell averaged 3.7 points and 1.9 assists per game as a backup point guard to Jared Harper. Following the season, he transferred to Baylor and sat out his next season due to NCAA transfer rules. During his redshirt year, he improved his all-around game and studied film on guards like Kyle Lowry and Jalen Brunson. During his sophomore season, Mitchell was a starter on one of the top teams in the nation. On December 18, 2019, he posted a season-high 19 points, four assists and four steals in a 91–63 win over UT Martin. As a sophomore, Mitchell averaged 9.9 points and 3.8 assists per game. He was named Big 12 Newcomer of the Year, while earning Third Team All-Big 12, All-Defensive and All-Newcomer Team honors.

In his junior season, Mitchell became an improved shooter and passer. He scored a career-high 31 points and seven three-pointers in a 107–59 win over Kansas State on January 27, 2021. Mitchell helped Baylor win its first national championship, recording 15 points, six rebounds and five assists in a 86–70 win against previously undefeated Gonzaga in the title game. He received the Naismith Defensive Player of the Year Award, NABC Defensive Player of the Year and the Lefty Driesell Award as the top defensive player in the nation. Mitchell earned Big 12 Defensive Player of the Year and First Team All-Big 12 honors. On April 13, he declared for the 2021 NBA draft, forgoing his remaining college eligibility.

Professional career

Sacramento Kings (2021–present) 
Mitchell was selected with the ninth overall pick in the 2021 NBA draft by the Sacramento Kings. On August 5, 2021, he signed his rookie scale contract with the Kings. Mitchell helped the Kings win the 2021 NBA Summer League Championship and was named NBA Summer League MVP alongside Cam Thomas. Mitchell was also selected to the All-NBA Summer League First Team.

On October 20, Mitchell made his NBA debut, recording two points, three rebounds and three assists in a 124–121 win over the Portland Trail Blazers. On March 20, 2022, he scored a career-high 28 points, alongside three rebounds and nine assists, in a 127–124 overtime loss to the Phoenix Suns.

Career statistics

NBA

Regular season

|-
| style="text-align:left;"|
| style="text-align:left;"|Sacramento
| 75 || 19 || 27.7 || .418 || .316 || .659 || 2.2 || 4.2 || .7 || .3 || 11.5
|- class="sortbottom"
| style="text-align:center;" colspan="2"|Career 
| 75 || 19 || 27.7 || .418 || .316 || .659 || 2.2 || 4.2 || .7 || .3 || 11.5

College

|-
| style="text-align:left;"| 2017–18
| style="text-align:left;"| Auburn
| 34 || 0 || 17.1 || .429 || .288 || .677 || 1.1 || 1.9 || .5 || .0 || 3.7
|-
| style="text-align:left;"| 2018–19
| style="text-align:left;"| Baylor
| style="text-align:center;" colspan="11"|  Redshirt
|-
| style="text-align:left;"| 2019–20
| style="text-align:left;"| Baylor
| 30 || 30 || 32.4 || .409 || .324 || .663 || 2.7 || 3.8 || 1.5 || .4 || 9.9
|-
| style="text-align:left;"| 2020–21
| style="text-align:left;"| Baylor
| 30 || 30 || 33.0 || .511 || .447 || .652 || 2.7 || 5.5 || 1.9 || .4 || 14.1
|- class="sortbottom"
| style="text-align:center;" colspan="2"| Career
| 94 || 60 || 27.1 || .459 || .376 || .661 || 2.1 || 3.6 || 1.3 || .2 || 9.0

References

External links
Baylor Bears bio
Auburn Tigers bio

1998 births
Living people
All-American college men's basketball players
American men's basketball players
Auburn Tigers men's basketball players
Basketball players from Georgia (U.S. state)
Baylor Bears men's basketball players
People from Hinesville, Georgia
Point guards
Sacramento Kings draft picks
Sacramento Kings players